Cam Hall (born November 1, 1982) is a former Canadian football linebacker. He was signed by the Winnipeg Blue Bombers as an undrafted free agent in 2008. He played college football at Boise State.

Hall was also a member of the Montreal Alouettes.

External links
Montreal Alouettes bio
Winnipeg Blue Bombers bio

1982 births
Living people
People from Richland, Washington
American players of Canadian football
Canadian football linebackers
Boise State Broncos football players
Winnipeg Blue Bombers players
Montreal Alouettes players